HMS Swaggerer was the French privateer Bonaparte (or Napoleon), captured in 1809 (or 1808). She served the Royal Navy in the Leeward Islands until broken up in 1815.


Career
The circumstances of Bonapartes capture are obscure and there are no details as to her dimensions.

The British renamed her Swaggerer and armed her with eight 18-pounder carronades and two 6-pounder guns. Lieutenant George James Evelyn, late of  commissioned her on 8 February 1809.

On 17 April 1809,  captured D'Hautpoul. Swaggerer was among the vessels entitled to share in the prize money. Thereafter, Swaggerer assisted at the capture of Martinique, The Saintes, and Guadeloupe.

In August 1812 Swaggerer was in company with  when they captured four American vessels:
General Hamilton (11 August), lying at Parimarabo, Surinam, carrying a cargo of molasses;
Mary (11 August), lying at Parimarabo, Surinam, in ballast;
Pochohantes (12 August), lying at Braam's Point, Surinam, and carrying a cargo of salt; and
Mercator (24 August), bound to Baltimore, laden with molasses.

Evelyn was invalided out of Swaggerer in October 1812. His replacement, Lieutenant Martin Guise, took command of Swaggerer in 1813. In May Lloyd's List reported that Swaggerer had recaptured Jane, which had been sailing from Demerrary to Saint John, New Brunswick, when the Baltimore privateer  had captured her. Between 22 May and 9 June, Swaggerer sent into St Thomas three vessels: 
Donna Francisca, Ferrara, master, which had been sailing from Guadeloup to Boston; and
Betsey, Hall, master, from Portland: and,
Peggy, Little, master, from Bath.

Then in 1814 Lieutenant Charles Deyman Jeremy (or Jermy) replaced Guise. 
Swaggerer was in company with  when, on 13 March 1814, they captured the brigantine Admiral Martin, which they sent in to Antigua. Then on 28 March Swaggerer and  captured Camilla, which they sent into Tortola. By December, Swaggerer was under the command of Lieutenant Alexander Sandilands.

Fate
Swaggerer was broken up in 1815.

Notes

Citations

References
O'Byrne, William R. (1849) A Naval Biographical Dictionary: comprising the life and services of every living officer in Her Majesty's navy, from the rank of admiral of the fleet to that of lieutenant, inclusive. (London: J. Murray), vol. 1.
Patterson, Benton Rain (2005) The generals: Andrew Jackson, Sir Edward Pakenham, and the road to the Battle of New Orleans. (NYU Press). 
 

Brigs of the Royal Navy
1809 ships
Captured ships
Privateer ships of France